Outline of life may refer to:

 Outline of biology (the study of life and living organisms)
 Outline of life forms
 Outline of life science